Sancé, Bam is a town in the Tikare Department of Bam Province in northern Burkina Faso. It has a population of 1085.

References

Populated places in the Centre-Nord Region
Bam Province